794 Naval Air Squadron (794 NAS) was a Naval Air Squadron of the Royal Navy's Fleet Air Arm.

Notable people
Ronald Scott (aviator)

References

Citations

Bibliography

700 series Fleet Air Arm squadrons
Military units and formations established in 1940
Military units and formations of the Royal Navy in World War II
Military units and formations disestablished in 1947
1940 establishments in the United Kingdom
1947 disestablishments in the United Kingdom